South Beach Tow is an American television series that portrayed dramatized reenactments of the day-to-day business of Tremont Towing, a family-run towing business in Miami Beach, and South Beach Towing, a towing company in Gladeview created by the workers of Tremont in Season 4. Both are actual towing companies in Florida; however, South Beach Towing has ceased operations and closed down within the last two years leaving only Tremont Towing still currently in business. It was produced by Bodega Pictures and Nuyorican Productions, and it aired on the American cable channel truTV, the show ran for 4 seasons from July 20, 2011 to December 10, 2014. The final episode titled "Checkmate" aired on December 3, 2014, which ended the story on a major cliffhanger. A week later, a bonus episode ("Bernice's Top 20") aired on December 10, concluding the series with a total of 87 episodes. The series then went into limbo and was presumed cancelled. Though truTV has never made an official statement of its cancellation, the network has since removed it from its programming. Although the program is fictionalized, Tremont Towing and South Beach Towing are real towing companies in Miami Beach and Gladeview.

Inception
According to the cast member Christie Ashenoff, the idea for the program came after Tremont towed the car of Simon Fields: "He tells us that a few days later a light bulb went off in his head that if he lost his mind, that everyone else must too." Jennifer Lopez produces the program through her production company, Nuyorican Productions.

Plot
The show's scenes generally center on the cast towing vehicles and facing different levels of opposition from vehicle owners. South Beach Tow also portrays Tremont Towing engaging in several disputes with a rival towing company called The Finest Towing (which eventually becomes Goodfellas). The Finest is owned by Robert Sr's rival, Larry Diaz    shown to employ very corrupt drivers who go as far as stealing tows, injuring Tremont drivers, and once putting sugar in several of Tremont's trucks' gas tanks. Larry is also a rage driven man built on taking down Robert and Tremont Towing. The drivers at Finest responsible for the latter were arrested on camera, although those scenes were part of the staged script. Tremont Towing continues to rival with Finest, now named "Goodfellas" - which is now part of Tremont. After the Mid-Season Finale of Season 3, Perez convinced Robbie to work on the side with him at his own towing company which was called R&P Towing (Robbie & Perez). Robbie eventually got fed up with Christie being in charge of Tremont when he felt he should have gotten the manager promotion and she makes a big decision without him (she was thinking about selling Tremont to Felix Hernandez ), so with that Robbie quits Tremont. Christie eventually found out in Season 3 Episode 23 (50 Shades of Bernice), that Perez and Robbie were working together. Perez then locked everyone out of Tremont which gave him the opportunity to steal the repo orders. In the Season 3 Finale (Deuces, Tremont), Christie and Perez planned a partnership between R&P and Tremont, which ends up being the end Tremont and R&P Towing . In the Season 4 Premiere, (Apocalypse Tow) things go haywire when the R&P Towing office explodes (due to a towed person throwing his cigarette in the building while they were in the middle of an exterminating process and had a gas leak), but they were able to get this back on track.

In the second episode of Season 4 (Flipping Out), the crew moved to Miami, located at the former Goodfellas lot, which is now called "South Beach Towing" thanks to Kosgrove coming up with the name. Meanwhile, Bernice and her mother, Reva, start a food truck business out of a food truck they repossessed in the Season 3 Finale. In episode 13 of Season 4 (Checkmate) Robbie made a deal with Perez to give him 51% stake in the company in order to save the yard from being rezoned. The show ended with a cliffhanger after the news is spread to Christie.

Staged performances
Although the show is officially classified as a reality television program, it depicts actors performing reenactments of events.  When questioned on the program's veracity, a spokesman said that the show "features real people and is based on real situations. Due to production needs, some scenes are reenacted."  At the end of each episode, during the credits, a disclaimer is now posted "The stories that are portrayed in this program are based on real events."

Prior to truTV's admission that scenes were reenacted, several news outlets reported evidence that the show was not a true "day in the life" documentary. Rumors persisted about the obvious use of wireless microphones by everybody with a speaking part in the show and the over the top nature of much of the program's content. The celebrity gossip blog Radar posted a video of actors politely awaiting the start of a violent scene.

Cast

Tremont Towing drivers 
 Lakatriona Brunson – Bernice (assistant manager as of Season 3)
 Jerome "J-Money" Jackson – driver
 Eddie Del Busto – driver
 Gilbert Perez – driver
 Robert "Robbie" Ashenoff Jr. – Son of Robert Ashenoff Sr. and senior driver at Tremont Towing
 Davy Desoto – driver (started in season 3)
 Frankie – driver (only in Season 1)

Tremont Towing office managers 
 Christie Ashenoff – dispatcher at Tremont Towing (later general manager) and daughter of Robert Ashenoff Sr.   
 Robert Ashenoff Sr. – founder, owner, and general manager of Tremont Towing.
 Dave Kosgrove – dispatcher as Tremont Towing (Started in Season 2) and former Miami-Dade County Inspector.

South Beach Towing office managers 
 Lakatriona "Bernice" Brunson – assistant manager and driver 
 Christie Ashenoff – general manager (25%)
 Robert Ashenoff Jr – Co-general manager (24%)
 Gilbert Perez – Co-general manager (51%)
 Samir Garfield – Dispatcher OINKKKK

South Beach Towing Drivers 
 Lakatriona "Bernice" Brunson – driver(assistant manager)
 Jerome "J-Money" Jackson – driver 
 Eddie Del Busto – driver
 Gilbert Perez – driver
 Robert "Robbie" Ashenoff Jr. – driver
 Davy Desoto – driver
 Niki – driver (introduced in the Season 3 finale she robbed Perez for his bank deposit and started as a driver in Season 4 to pay Perez back the money she took from him)

Episodes

Series Overview

Season 1 (2011–12)

Season 2 (2012–13)

Season 3 (2013–14)

Season 4 (2014)

Broadcast
In America the series premiered on the channel truTV on July 20, 2011 and ended on December 10th, 2014. The show concluded with Season 4 Episode 14 (Bernice's Top 20).

In Italy, the series premiered on DMAX in 2011 and is now ended.

In Australia, the series premiered on GO! on September 1, 2015.

References

External links
 
 South Beach Tow truTV website
 Official Website

2010s American reality television series
2011 American television series debuts
2014 American television series endings
Television shows set in Miami
TruTV original programming